Benjamin Police (born 19 May 1988) is a French professional footballer who plays for Gonfreville, as a defender. He appeared in Ligue 1 for Le Havre.

References

1988 births
Living people
French footballers
Footballers from Rouen
Le Havre AC players
ESM Gonfreville players
Ligue 2 players
Ligue 1 players
Championnat National players
Association football defenders